Sextile is an American post-punk band from Los Angeles, California. The band consists of founding members Brady Keehn (vocals, guitar, electronics) and Melissa Scaduto (drums, electronics, guitar). The band takes its name from the aspect of the same name in astrology.

History
Sextile was formed in 2015 by Keehn and Scaduto, after the duo relocated from Brooklyn, New York to Los Angeles. They were soon joined by bassist Kenny Elkin and multi-instrumentalist Eddie Wuebben. Signing to Felte Records after supporting Ritual Howls at local gigs, the band released its debut album, A Thousand Hands in the same year. Its follow-up, Albeit Living, was released in 2017; by the time of its release, Elkin was replaced by bassist Cameron Michel.

In 2018, Sextile released the single "Current Affair," with the band reduced to its two founding members for their EP, 3, later in the year. Sextile entered a hiatus in 2019, with Keehn and Scaduto pursuing other projects, Panther Modern and S. Product, respectively. 

The band's former guitarist, Eddie Wuebben, died in 2019.

Sextile broke its hiatus with the March 2022 release of "Modern Weekend"/"Contortion", both having been written after Wuebben's death. For summer 2022 tour dates in Mexico and the U.S., Cameron Michel rejoined the band on guitar and keyboards along with new drummer Lia Simone Braswell, formerly of Le Butcherettes and A Place to Bury Strangers.

Musical style
Sextile's sound has been described as post-punk and electronic rock. Their debut album featured an "occult-inspired post-punk style" that blended industrial, surf-punk, psychobilly and ambient music; the band drew influences from Christian Death, Coil, Brian Eno, The Cramps and The Haxan Cloak during this period. AllMusic critic Heather Phares thought that the record "gave death rock some new life" while featuring "descending riffs, martial beats, and outbursts that light up the darkness like flares." Their second album, Albeit Living, marked a change in style with a synth-punk sound that was likened to the works of Circle X, D.A.F. and Chrome. Michael Toland of The Austin Chronicle wrote that the record collects "post-punk's angular chords, synth-pop's buzzing colors, No Wave's brash indifference, and goth's pessimistic glower." Its follow-up, 2018's 3 EP, showcased further embracement of electronics while introducing elements from EBM and darkwave.

Band members
Current members
 Brady Keehn — vocals, guitar, electronics
 Melissa Scaduto — drums, electronics, guitar
 Cameron Michel — guitar, keyboards
 Lia Simone Braswell - drums

Former members
 Eddie Wuebben — guitar, synthesizer 
 Kenny Elkin — bass

Discography
Studio albums
 A Thousand Hands (2015)
 Albeit Living (2017)

EP
 3 (2018)

Singles
 "Current Affair" (2018)
 "Paradox" (2018)
 "Modern Weekend" / "Contortion" (2022)

Music videos
 "Visions of You" (2015)
 "Can't Take It" (2016)
 "One Of These" (2017)
 "Ripped" (2017)
 "Disco" (2018)
 "Paradox" (2019)
 "Hazing" (2019)

References

External links

Musical groups established in 2015
Punk rock groups from California
Electronic music groups from California
Musical groups from Los Angeles
Musical quartets
American post-punk music groups
American electronic rock musical groups
Electropunk musical groups
American musical duos
Rock music duos
Electronic music duos
2015 establishments in California